Colleen Rosensteel (born March 13, 1967) is an American judoka and a Pan American games silver medalist.

Biography
Rosensteel was born in Greensburg, Pennsylvania.  She attended the University of Florida in Gainesville, Florida, where she was a member of the Florida Gators track and field team.  She graduated with a bachelor's degree and master's degree in exercise and sport sciences in 1990 and 1994, respectively, and was later inducted into the University of Florida Athletic Hall of Fame as a "Gator Great."

Rosensteel competed for the United States judo team in three consecutive Summer Olympics: the 1992 Summer Olympics in Barcelona, Spain; the 1996 Summer Olympics in Atlanta, Georgia; and the 2000 Summer Olympics in Sydney, Australia.  Her best Olympic finish was a ninth-place tie in 2000.

Rosensteel won a bronze medal in the women's heavyweight (+78 kg) division at the 1995 Pan American Games in Mar del Plata, Argentina.  She won a silver medal in the women's heavyweight division at the 1999 Pan American Games in Winnipeg, Manitoba, Canada.

As a 17-year-old, she also was a top ranked discus thrower, earning a silver medal at the 1984 Pan American Junior Athletics Championships.

She currently works at South Fayette Township School District as the Athletic Lifting and Conditioning Trainer.

See also 
List of University of Florida alumni
List of University of Florida Athletic Hall of Fame members
List of University of Florida Olympians

References

External links 
 
 

1967 births
Living people
American female judoka
Judoka at the 1992 Summer Olympics
Judoka at the 1996 Summer Olympics
Judoka at the 2000 Summer Olympics
Judoka at the 1995 Pan American Games
Judoka at the 1999 Pan American Games
Olympic judoka of the United States
People from Greensburg, Pennsylvania
University of Florida alumni
Pan American Games silver medalists for the United States
Pan American Games bronze medalists for the United States
Pan American Games medalists in judo
Medalists at the 1995 Pan American Games
Medalists at the 1999 Pan American Games
21st-century American women